This is a list of notable people from the U.S. state of California. It includes people who were born/raised in, lived in, or spent portions of their lives in California, or for whom California is a significant part of their identity. This list is arranged in alphabetical order by surname.

0–9 
 12th Planet – record producer and DJ
 24kGoldn – rapper
 24hrs – rapper
 2Mex – rapper

A 

 Willie Aames – actor

 Stephen Abas – Olympic freestyle wrestler
 Paula Abdul – dancer (American Idol)
 Rosalie Abrams – playwright, actress, and activist
 Ansel Adams – photographer
 Davante Adams – NFL wide receiver
 Jay Adams – skateboarder and surfer
 Erik Affholter (born 1966) – NFL wide receiver 
 Ben Affleck – Academy Award-winning actor and director
 Jhene Aiko – singer
 Jessica Alba – actress and model
 Edward Albert – actor
 Josh Allen – NFL quarterback
 Keegan Allen – actor (Pretty Little Liars)
 Marcus Allen – football player
 A. J. Allmendinger – NASCAR driver
 Herb Alpert – trumpeter and music executive
 Tony Alva – skateboarder and surfer
 Helen Andelin – author (Fascinating Womanhood)
 Anthony Anderson – actor
 Melissa Sue Anderson – actress
 Paul Thomas Anderson – filmmaker
 Tom Anderson – co-founder of the social network MySpace
 Jennifer Aniston – actress (Friends)
 Odette Annable – actress
 apl.de.ap – Filipino-American rapper, singer and record producer (Black Eyed Peas)
 Christina Applegate – actress
 Jon Appleton – composer
 Anne Archer – actress
 Eve Arden – actress
 Billie Joe Armstrong – musician, guitarist, and vocalist (Green Day)
 Lucie Arnaz – actress
 Maureen Arthur – actress (How to Succeed in Business Without Really Trying)
 Maude Apatow – actress (Euphoria)
 Reginald "Fieldy" Arvizu – bassist (Korn)
 Anastasia Ashman – writer
 Shiri Appleby – actress and film director
 Sean Astin – actor (The Lord of the Rings)
 Jeff Atkinson – distance runner and Olympian
 Coco Austin – television personality 
 Tracy Austin – tennis player
 Dylan Axelrod – baseball player

B 

 B-Real – rapper
 Max Baer Jr. – actor (Jethro Bodine of The Beverly Hillbillies)
 Baby Bash – rapper
 Ross Bagdasarian Sr. – actor (Alvin and the Chipmunks)
 Chauncey Bailey – journalist assassinated by an agent of Your Black Muslim Bakery
 Diane Baker – actress (The Silence of the Lambs)
 Dusty Baker – Major League Baseball player and manager
 David Bakhtiari – NFL offensive tackle
 Ireland Baldwin – model
 Fairuza Balk – actress
 Banks – singer
 Tyra Banks – model and actress (The Fresh Prince of Bel-Air)
 Ronald Barak (born 1943) – Olympic gymnast
 Adrienne Barbeau – actress (Maude)
 Andrea Barber – actress
 Sara Bareilles – singer
 Travis Barker – drummer (Blink-182)
 Matt Barnes – National Basketball Association player
 Orr Barouch – Israeli soccer player
 Drew Barrymore – actress (E.T. the Extra-Terrestrial, Never Been Kissed)
 Judith Barsi – actress and voiceover artist
 Summer Bartholomew – Miss USA 1975
 Dante Basco – actor
 Earl W. Bascom – rodeo pioneer, Hall of Fame inductee, actor, international artist, and sculptor
 Ellen Bass – poet and author
 Bassnectar – musician and record producer
 Max Baucus – politician, former Congressman (1975–78), longtime U.S. Senator from Montana (1978–2014), and U.S. Ambassador to China since 2014
 Emma Pow Bauder – evangelist
 Michael Bay – film director
 Amanda Beard – Olympic swimmer
 Beck – musician
 Captain Beefheart – musician
 Ed Begley Jr. – actor and activist
 Drake Bell – actor, comedian, and singer
 Stephania Bell – ESPN analyst and physical therapist
 Camilla Belle – actress
 Tory Belleci – filmmaker and model maker (MythBusters)
 Troian Bellisario – actress and singer (Pretty Little Liars)
 Hester A. Benedict (1838-1921), president, Pacific Coast Women's Press Association
 Marcus Benjamin – early biographer at Smithsonian Institution
 Beau Bennett – hockey player
 Ashley Benson – actress (Pretty Little Liars)
 Justin Berfield – actor (Malcolm in the Middle)
 Candice Bergen – actress (Murphy Brown)
 Berner - rapper and cannabis entrepreneur 
Davion Berry (born 1991) – basketball player in the Israeli Basketball Premier League
 Carolyn Beug – passenger aboard American Airlines Flight 11
 Yusuf Bey – owner of Your Black Muslim Bakery
 Mayim Bialik – Israeli-American actress (The Big Bang Theory, Blossom) and neuroscientist
 Barbara Billingsley – actress
 Rachel Bilson – actress (The O.C.)
 David Binn – 18-season NFL long snapper
 Matt Biondi – competitive swimmer and eight-time Olympic gold medalist
 Thora Birch – actress
Jake Bird (born 1995) - baseball pitcher for the Colorado Rockies 
 Steve Birnbaum – Major League Soccer player
 Bradford Bishop – indicted murderer and at-large fugitive
 Joel Bitonio – NFL offensive guard
 Bill Bixby – actor (The Incredible Hulk)
 Aloe Blacc – singer and musician
 Jack Black – actor and musician (Kung Fu Panda, Tenacious D)
 Rebecca Black – singer
 Tyler Blackburn – actor and singer (Pretty Little Liars)
 Tara Lynne Barr – actress
 Hank Blalock – baseball player (Texas Rangers)
 Mel Blanc – cartoon voice actor
 Rowan Blanchard – actress (Girl Meets World)
 Erica Blasberg (1984–2010) – LPGA golfer
 Sheila Bleck – IFBB professional bodybuilder
 Mel Bleeker (1920–1996) – NFL halfback
 Ken Block – rally driver and gymkhana driver
 Andy Bloom – Olympic shot putter
 Betsy Bloomingdale – socialite
 April Bowlby – actress
 David Blu (born David Bluthenthal) – professional basketball player (Maccabi Tel Aviv)
 Rora Blue - visual artist
 Blueface – rapper
 Jason Blum – film producer
 Jonathon Blum – hockey player
 Judy Blumberg – competitive ice dancer
 Sam Bohne (born Sam Cohen) – baseball player
 Brian Boitano − Olympic gold medalist (figure skating)
 Barry Bonds – baseball player (San Francisco Giants)
 Bobby Bonds – baseball player (San Francisco Giants)
 Aaron Boone – baseball player (Cleveland Indians)
 Scott Borchetta – record executive, entrepreneur, and founder of Big Machine Records
 Jonathan Bornstein – soccer player for USA National Team and Chicago Fire FC
 Cindy Bortz – 1987 World Junior champion figure skater
 Barry Bostwick – actor (The Rocky Horror Picture Show, Spin City)
 Kate Bosworth – actress
 Lo Bosworth – TV personality, author, and entrepreneur
 Shmuley Boteach – Orthodox rabbi, radio and television host, and author
 Bruce Bowen – National Basketball Association player (San Antonio Spurs)
 Barbara Boxer - United States Senator from California from 1993 to 2017; United States Representative from 1983 to 1993
 Cameron Boyce – actor (Descendants 2)
 Brandon Boyd – singer and musician (Incubus)
 Brittany Boyd – WNBA player
 Timothy Bradley – boxer
 Tom Brady – football quarterback
 Debbie Bramwell-Washington – IFBB professional bodybuilder
 Benjamin Bratt – actor
 Ryan Braun – baseball player (Milwaukee Brewers)
 Nick Bravin – Olympic fencer
 Eddie Bravo – Brazilian jiu-jitsu instructor
 Nicholas Brendon – actor (Buffy the Vampire Slayer)
 Jan Brewer – Governor of Arizona
 Stephen Breyer – Associate Justice of the Supreme Court of the United States
 Patrick Brennan – actor
 Brigita Brezovac – IFBB professional bodybuilder
 Phoebe Bridgers  – singer-songwriter 
 Beau Bridges – actor (The Fabulous Baker Boys, Stargate SG-1)
 Jeff Bridges – actor (The Big Lebowski, True Grit)
 Lloyd Bridges – actor (Airplane!, Sea Hunt)
 Alison Brie – actress
 Lance Briggs – football player
 Adam Brody – actor (The O.C.)
 James Brolin – actor
 Josh Brolin – actor (Avengers: Infinity War, Avengers: Endgame)
 Albert Brooks – actor and director (Lost in America)
 Alton Brown – television host
Anthony Brown (born 1992) - basketball player in the Israeli Basketball Premier League
 Carlon Brown – basketball player, 2013-14 top scorer in the Israel Basketball Premier League
 Jerry Brown – Governor of California (1975–83; 2011–19) and Mayor of Oakland
 Pat Brown – Governor of California (1959–1967)
 Tedy Bruschi – football player
 Lindsey Buckingham – musician (Fleetwood Mac)
 Bill Buckner – baseball player
 Don Budge – tennis player
 Candace Cameron Bure – actress
 Hunter Burgan – bass player for AFI
 Bobby Burgess – Mouseketeer and dancer for The Lawrence Welk Show
 Olivia Burnette – actress
 Cliff Burton – former Metallica bassist
 Tim Burton – film director
 Reggie Bush – football player
 Shoshana Bush – actress
 Sophia Bush – activist, spokesperson, and actress (Chicago P.D., One Tree Hill)
 Jeanie Buss – sports executive
 Justin Baldoni – actor and filmmaker
 Cruz Bustamante – Lieutenant Governor of California
 Paul Butcher – actor
 Austin Butler – actor and singer
 Brian Patrick Butler – actor and filmmaker
 Win Butler – musician and songwriter (Arcade Fire)
 Amanda Bynes – actress
 Kari Byron – artist and TV personality (MythBusters)
 Lonzo Ball – professional basketball player (Chicago Bulls)
 LiAngelo Ball – basketball player
 LaMelo Ball – basketball player (Charlotte Hornets)

C 

 Calmatic – filmmaker
 Scott Caan – actor
 Johnathan Cabral – Olympic hurdler
 Richard Cabral – actor
 Herb Caen – newspaper columnist (San Francisco Chronicle)
 John Cage – composer
 Nicolas Cage – actor
 Colleen Camp – actress
 Colbie Caillat – singer
 Evan Call – composer
 Angelo Caloiaro (born 1989) – American-Italian basketball player in the Israeli Basketball Premier League
 Greg Camarillo – NFL wide receiver
 Dove Cameron – actress (Liv and Maddie)
 Dolph Camilli – baseball player
 Ben Nighthorse Campbell – U.S. Senator from Colorado
 Nick Cannon – actor
 Linda Cardellini – actress (Freaks and Geeks)
 Tucker Carlson – television host
 Adam Carolla – radio and TV personality
 David Carr – football quarterback
 Derek Carr – football quarterback
 David Carradine – actor (Kill Bill: Volume 1, Kill Bill: Volume 2)
 Ever Carradine – actress and daughter of Robert Carradine
 Emma Chamberlain – internet personality
 Keith Carradine – actor (Deadwood, Nashville)
 Robert Carradine – actor (Revenge of the Nerds)
 Pete Carroll – college and National Football League football coach
 Adam Carson – drummer for AFI
 Chris Carter – producer, director, and writer (The X-Files)
 Mike Carter (born 1955) – American-Israeli basketball player
 Shaun Cassidy – singer 
 Torry Castellano – drummer for The Donnas
 Henry Cejudo – former UFC champion, Olympic gold medalist in freestyle wrestling
 Richard Chamberlain – actor
 Chanel West Coast – rapper, actress, model, and TV personality
 Brandi Chastain – soccer player
 Jessica Chastain – actress (The Tree of Life, Zero Dark Thirty)
 Doja Cat – rapper and singer
 Kwan Cheatham (born 1995) – basketball player in the Israel Basketball Premier League
 Cher – actress, entertainer, and singer
 Joey Chestnut – competitive eater
 Julia Child – chef, author, and TV personality
 Margaret Cho – actress and comedian
 Justin Chon – actor
 Amy Chow – gymnast
 Jamie Chung – actress
 Lana Clarkson – actress (Fast Times at Ridgemont High)
 Les Claypool – bass player (Primus)
 Melinda Clarke – actress
 Mark Clear – Major League Baseball two-time All-Star relief pitcher
 Claire Coffee – actress
 Audra Cohen (born 1986) – tennis player
 Jordan Cohen (born 1997) – American-Israeli basketball player in the Israel Basketball Premier League
 Sasha Cohen – figure skater
 Lillie Hitchcock Coit – firefighter
 Keyshia Cole – singer
 Natalie Cole – singer
 Jerry Coleman – soldier and sportscaster
 Chris Colfer – actor (Glee) and author (The Land of Stories)
 Holly Marie Combs – actress
 Maureen Connolly – tennis player
 Mike Connors – actor (Mannix)
 Lauren Conrad – TV personality, fashion designer, and author
 Elisha Cook Jr. – actor (The Maltese Falcon)
 Coolio – rapper, singer, record producer, and actor
 Lillian Copeland (1904–1964) - Olympic discus champion; set world records in discus, javelin, and shot put
 Miranda Cosgrove – actress and singer (iCarly)
 Michael Costello – fashion designer
 Kevin Costner – actor and director (Dances with Wolves, Field of Dreams)
 Natalie Coughlin – Olympic swimmer
 Glenn Cowan (1952–2004) – table tennis player
 Nikki Cox – actress (Las Vegas)
 Mary Lynde Craig — president, Pacific Coast Women's Press Association
 Alan Cranston – U.S. Senator from California
 Bryan Cranston – actor
 Laura Creavalle – Guyanese-born Canadian-American professional bodybuilder
 Richard Crenna – actor
 Darren Criss – actor
 William Henry Crocker – philanthropist and founder of Crocker National Bank
 James Cromwell – actor
 Joe Cronin – Hall of Fame baseball player and manager
 David Crosby – musician
 Denise Crosby – actress
 Cameron Crowe – filmmaker
 Raymond Cruz – actor
 Valorie Curry – actress (The Tick)
 Kaley Cuoco – actress (The Big Bang Theory)
 Jake Curhan (born 1998) – American football offensive tackle for the Seattle Seahawks of the National Football League (NFL)
 Jamie Lee Curtis – actress (Halloween, Trading Places)
 Cole Custer – NASCAR driver
 Carly Chaikin – actress
 Doug Clifford – drummer (member of the band Creedence Clearwater Revival)
 Wendi McLendon-Covey – actress

D 

 Carson Daly – television host
 Zubin Damania (born 1973) – physician, comedian, internet personality, musician, and founder of Turntable Health
 Caroline D'Amore – musician, actress, and model
 Spencer Daniels – actor
 Sean Danielsen – singer and musician (Smile Empty Soul)
 Harry Danning – Major League Baseball All-Star catcher
 Ted Danson – actor (Cheers, The Good Place)
 Sam Darnold – NFL quarterback
 Iva Toguri D'Aquino (Tokyo Rose) – radio broadcaster during World War II
 Lindsay Davenport – tennis player
 Baron Davis – professional basketball player
 Jonathan Davis – singer and musician
 Lucius Davis (born 1970) – basketball player 
Noah Davis (nicknamed Diesel; born 1997) - MLB baseball player (Colorado Rockies)
 Terrell Davis – professional football player
 Ken Davitian – Armenian-American character actor
 Devin Dawson – singer and musician
 Jonathan Dayton – film director (Little Miss Sunshine)
 Oscar De La Hoya – boxer
 Giada De Laurentiis – Italian born chef
 Brian de la Puente – National Football League center
 Zack de la Rocha – activist and singer (Rage Against the Machine)
 Lil Debbie – rapper
 Jayme Dee – singer and musician
 Javin DeLaurier (born 1998) - basketball player in the Israeli Basketball Premier League
 Grey Delisle – voice actress
 Tom DeLonge – singer and musician (Blink-182)
 Brad Delson – musician (Linkin Park)
 Alexa Demie – actress and singer 
 Deorro – DJ and musician
 David Denman – actor
 Bo Derek – actress
 Laura Dern – actress
 DeMar DeRozan – professional basketball player
 Emily Deschanel – actress
 Zooey Deschanel – actress and singer
 Zoey Deutch – actress 
 Cameron Diaz – actress (Charlie's Angels, Charlie's Angels: Full Throttle)
 Nate Diaz – professional mixed martial artist
 Nick Diaz – professional mixed martial artist
 Matt DiBenedetto – NASCAR driver
 Leonardo DiCaprio – Academy Award-winning actor (The Departed, Titanic)
 Joan Didion – writer
 Vin Diesel – actor
 Grace Van Dien – actress
 Trent Dilfer – National Football League quarterback
 Joe DiMaggio – baseball player
 Maya DiRado – Olympic swimmer
 Roy E. Disney – billionaire and nephew of Walt Disney
 Cong Thanh Do – Vietnamese American activist
 David Dobrik – vlogger
 Nate Dogg – musician
 Snoop Dogg – rapper
 Ami Dolenz – actress and daughter of Micky Dolenz
 Micky Dolenz – actor, musician, and singer (The Monkees)
 Jason Dolley – actor
 Landon Donovan – soccer player
 Jimmy Doolittle – general and aviation pioneer
 Tyler Dorsey (born 1996) – Greek–American basketball player in the Israeli Basketball Premier League
 Marcus Dove – basketball player
 Drake – Canadian rapper
 Stacy Dragila – pole vaulter
 Dr. Dre – musician, hip-hop producer, and record producer
 K. Eric Drexler – engineer
 Don Drysdale – baseball player
 Hilary Duff – actress and singer
 Tom Dumont – guitarist (No Doubt)
 Isadora Duncan – dancer
 Ann Dunnigan – translator, actor, and teacher
 Robert Duvall – actor
 Jermaine Dye – baseball player (Chicago White Sox)

E 

 E-40 – rapper
 Eric Erlandson – musician
 Susan Egan – actress
 Sheila E. – singer 
 Carl Earn (1921–2007) – tennis player
 Clint Eastwood – film actor and director (Million Dollar Baby, Unforgiven)
 Eazy-E – rapper
 Dennis Eckersley – baseball pitcher
 Aaron Eckhart – actor
 Julian Edelman – National Football League wide receiver
 Anthony Edwards – actor
 Mack Ray Edwards (1918–1971) – child sex abuser/serial killer; committed suicide by hanging in his prison cell
 Zac Efron – film and television actor (High School Musical)
 Billie Eilish – singer
 Thelma "Tiby" Eisen (1922–2014) – baseball player
Isaiah Eisendorf (born 1996) – American-Israeli basketball player in the Israeli Basketball Premier League
 Danny Elfman – musician and composer
 Jenna Elfman – actress
 Richard Elfman – film director (Forbidden Zone)
 Sam Elliott – actor
 Anabel Englund – singer
 Robert Englund – actor and director (A Nightmare on Elm Street)
 Hayden Epstein – National Football League kicker
 Mike "SuperJew" Epstein – Major League Baseball first baseman
 Philip Erenberg (1909–1992) – gymnast and Olympic silver medalist
 Zach Ertz – NFL tight end
 Chris Evans – convicted train robber
 Evidence – rapper
 Briana Evigan – actress (Step Up)

F 

 Fuslie – live streamer
 Shelly Fabares – actress and singer 
 Bill Fagerbakke – actor and voice actor (Patrick Star)
 Heather Fargo – Mayor of Sacramento, California
 Valerie Faris – film director (Little Miss Sunshine)
 Jordan Farmar – basketball player
 Lorrie Fair – retired soccer player
 Mia Farrow – actress
 David Faustino – actor (Married... with Children)
 Kevin Federline – rapper and former backup dancer
 Roshon Fegan – actor
 Benny Feilhaber – soccer midfielder
 Dianne Feinstein – U.S. Senator from California and Mayor of San Francisco (1978–88)
 Fergie (Stacy Ferguson) – singer, actress, and composer (Charlie Brown, The Dutchess, Fergalicious)
 Carlee Fernández – sculptor and photographer 
 Shiloh Fernandez – actor
 Sky Ferreira – singer, model, and actress
 Will Ferrell – actor
 Miguel Ferrer – actor (RoboCop)
 America Ferrera – Honduran-American actress
 Sally Field − actress (Norma Rae, Places in the Heart)
 Carrie Fisher – actress
 Chloe Fineman – actress
 Jon Fisher – author and entrepreneur
 Peggy Fleming – figure skater
 Shaun Fleming – actor (Kim Possible)
 Rhonda Fleming – actress and singer 
 Abigail Folger – coffee heiress, socialite, and murder victim
 Bridget Fonda – actress
 Lyndsy Fonseca – actress
 Beanie Feldstein – actress
 Jon Foreman – singer
 Dian Fossey – zoologist
 DeShaun Foster – football player
 Jodie Foster – actress (The Accused, The Silence of the Lambs)
 Rickie Fowler – professional golfer
 Allen Fox – tennis player (ranked as high as # 4) and coach
 Dillon Francis – music producer and DJ
 Dave Franco – actor and brother of James
 James Franco – actor and brother of Dave
 Jeff Franklin – director (Full House)
 Paulette Frankl – artist and biographer
 Bonnie Franklin – actress
 Missy Franklin – 2012 Olympic gold medalist (swimming)
 Max Fried – baseball player for the Atlanta Braves
 Frost – rapper
 Robert Frost – poet
 Kurt Fuller – actor
 Edward Furlong – actor (Terminator 2: Judgment Day)
 John Fogerty – musician (founded the band Creedence Clearwater Revival)
 Kevin Friedland (born 1981) - soccer player
 Taylor Fritz – tennis player
 Mackenzie Foy – actress and model

G 

 Giveon – singer
 Becky G – singer-songwriter and actress
 G-Eazy – rapper, singer and record producer
 King Lil G – rapper
 Guy Gabaldon – United States Marine Corps
 Lynx and Lamb Gaede – white nationalist twin singers and musicians
 Lady Gaga – singer
 Richard Gage – 9/11 Truth movement activist
 Corey Gaines (born 1965) – basketball player and coach
 Trace Gallagher – journalist
 The Game – rapper and actor
 Eric Garcetti – Mayor of Los Angeles
 Jeff Garcia – football player
 Jerry Garcia – musician (Grateful Dead)
 Andrew Garfield – actor
 Brad Garrett – actor (A Bug's Life, Everybody Loves Raymond)
 Spencer Garrett – actor
 Wolfgang Gartner – music producer and DJ
 Kyle Gass – musician (Tenacious D)
 Dirk Gates – network entrepreneur (Xirrus)
 John Gavin – actor and ambassador
 Sarah Michelle Gellar – actress (Buffy the Vampire Slayer)
 O.T. Genasis – rapper
 Inara George – singer and musician (The Bird and the Bee)
 Paul George − professional basketball player
 Lauren German – actress 
 Jason Giambi – professional baseball player (New York Yankees)
 Greg Gibson – Olympic Greco-Roman wrestler
 Tyrese Gibson – actor
 Frank Gifford – football player and sportscaster
 Brad Gilbert – tennis player and coach
 Melissa Gilbert – actress (Little House on the Prairie) and producer
 Sara Gilbert – actress (Roseanne)
 Lillian Moller Gilbreth – engineer (Cheaper by the Dozen)
 Justin Gimelstob – tennis player
 Enver Gjokaj – actor
 Danny Glover – actor
 Donald Glover – actor and singer
 Gnash – rapper and singer
 Jared Goff – NFL quarterback
 Bill Goldberg – professional NFL football player and undefeated professional wrestler
 Chelsey Goldberg – hockey player
 Rube Goldberg – cartoonist
 Paul Goldstein (born 1976) – tennis player and coach
 Tony Goldwyn – actor (Ghost, Tarzan)
 Selena Gomez – actress
 Phillip Gonyea – drummer and percussionist (Against the Will)
 Adrián González – baseball player
 Tony Gonzalez – NFL tight end
 Meagan Good – actress
 Drew Gooden – professional basketball player (Cleveland Cavaliers)
 Aaron Gordon – professional basketball player
 Jeff Gordon – NASCAR driver
 Robby Gordon – NASCAR driver
 Joseph Gordon-Levitt – actor
 Isidora Goreshter – actress
 Marjoe Gortner – evangelical minister
 Mark-Paul Gosselaar – actor
 Ben Gottschalk – National Football League offensive lineman
 Jim Grabb – tennis player ranked World No. 1 in doubles
 John Grabow – Major League Baseball player (Chicago Cubs)
 Kevin Graf – football offensive Tackle
 Alex Greenwald – musician
 Gloria Grahame – actress
 Andy Grammer – singer
 Farley Granger – actor
 Jennifer Granholm – Canadian-born politician and former Governor of Michigan (2003–2011)
 Beatrice Gray – actress
 Billy Gray – actor and motorcyclist
 Paul Gray – musician (Slipknot)
 Devon Graye – actor
 Brian Grazer – Academy Award-winning film and television producer
 Erick Green (born 1991) - basketball player in the Israeli Basketball Premier League
 Shawn Green – Major League Baseball two-time All-Star outfielder
 Joanie Greggains – radio show host, health, and fitness expert
 Sasha Grey – pornographic actress
 Nash Grier – Viner, YouTuber, and actor
 Merv Griffin – talk show host, singer, and television producer (Jeopardy!, Wheel of Fortune)
 Florence Griffith Joyner – track athlete
 Camryn Grimes – actress
 RL Grime – music producer
 Josh Groban – singer
 Ashley Grossman (born 1993) – water polo player
 Kim Gruenenfelder – author
 Vince Guaraldi – musician (A Charlie Brown Christmas)
 Kimberly Guilfoyle – TV personality
 Natalie Gulbis – golfer
 Brett Gurewitz – guitarist (Bad Religion)
 Alfred Guth (1908–1996) - Austrian-born American water polo player, swimmer, and Olympic modern pentathlete 
 Sharina Gutierrez –  model
 Tony Gwynn – Hall of Fame baseball player
 Jake Gyllenhaal – actor

H 

 Walter A. Haas Jr. – chief executive officer of Levi Strauss & Co.
 Steven C. Hackett – economist (Humboldt State University)
 Gene Hackman – actor (The French Connection)
 Tiffany Haddish – comedian
 Bella Hadid – model
 Gigi Hadid – model
 Sammy Hagar – musician (Van Halen)
 Merle Haggard – country music singer
 Joseph Hahn – painter, director, and musician (Linkin Park)
 Alana Haim – musician and actress
 Danielle Haim – musician
 Jackie Earle Haley – actor (Bad News Bears)
 Mark Hamill – actor (Star Wars)
 Jordan Hamilton (born 1990) – basketball player in the Israel Basketball Premier League
 Laird Hamilton – surfer
 Harry Hamlin – actor (Clash of the Titans)
 Armie Hammer – actor
 Kirk Hammett – musician (Metallica)
 Jonathan Hammond – filmmaker
 Daniel Handler – author, pen name (Lemony Snicket)
 Colin Hanks – actor (Fargo, King Kong)
 Chet Hanks – actor and musician
 Tom Hanks – actor, director, and producer
 Gabbie Hanna – Internet personality, singer-songwriter 
 Peter D. Hannaford – author and political advisor to Ronald Reagan
 Jeff Hanneman – guitarist (Slayer)
 James Harden – basketball player
 Ian Harding – actor (Pretty Little Liars)
 Dan Haren – professional baseball player (Oakland Athletics)
 Julia Hartz – entrepreneur
 Kay Hansen – mixed martial artist
 Mariska Hargitay – actress (Law & Order: Special Victims Unit)
 Jeff B. Harmon – film producer, director, and actor
 Mark Harmon – actor
 Kamala Harris – Vice President of the United States; former U.S. senator from California
 Henry Harrower – endocrinologist
 Kevin Harvick – NASCAR driver
 Teri Hatcher – actress
 Henry Hathaway – film director
 Davey Havok – lead singer of AFI
 Tony Hawk – skateboarder
 Kristy Hawkins – IFBB professional bodybuilder
 Lyn-Z Adams Hawkins – professional skateboarder
 Julie Hayek – Miss USA 1983
 Dennis Haysbert – actor (24)
 Jenna Haze – pornographic actress
 Patty Hearst – actress and newspaper heiress (Symbionese Liberation Army)
 William Randolph Hearst – newspaper publisher
 Ian Hecox – YouTuber
 Max Heidegger (born 1997) – American-Israeli basketball player in the Israeli Basketball Premier League
 Simon Helberg – actor and comedian (The Big Bang Theory)
 Julie Heldman – tennis player (ranked #5 in the world)
 Mariel Hemingway – actress (Manhattan)
 Christy Hemme – professional wrestler and model
 David Henrie – actor
 Sek Henry (born 1987) – professional basketball player, 2018 Israeli Basketball Premier League MVP
 Pamela Hensley – actress
 H.E.R. – singer
 Jay Hernandez – actor
 Keith Hernandez – baseball player
 Barbara Hershey – actress
 James Hetfield – musician (Metallica)
 Andy Hill (born c. 1950) – 3x college national champion basketball player, President of CBS Productions and Channel One News, author, and motivational speaker
 Jonah Hill – actor
 Emile Hirsch – actor
 Paris Hilton – celebrity, model, actress, and DJ
 Jason Hirsh – baseball player
 David Hoberman – film director and producer, and founder of Mandeville Films
 Douglas Hodge – CEO of PIMCO; charged with fraud for allegedly participating in the 2019 college admissions bribery scandal
 Dustin Hoffman – actor
 Trevor Hoffman – professional baseball player (San Diego Padres)
 Dexter Holland – singer and musician (The Offspring)
 Brenda Holloway – singer-songwriter
 Josh Holloway – actor (Lost)
 Mike Holmgren – football coach (Seattle Seahawks)
 Dennis Holt – poet, linguist, and translator
 Max Homa (born 1990) – professional golfer on the PGA Tour 
 Hopsin – rapper, actor, and record producer
 James Horner – composer
 Justin Hurwitz – composer
Nick Hornsby (born  1995) – basketball player for Hapoel Be'er Sheva in the Israeli Basketball Premier League
 Rhys Hoskins – Major League Baseball player
 Bryce Dallas Howard – actress
 Cody Horn – actress
 C. Thomas Howell – actor (The Outsiders, Red Dawn, Southland)
 Jerry Hsu – skateboarder
 Trevor Huddleston – NASCAR driver
 Huddy – social media personality 
 Vanessa Hudgens – actress and singer (High School Musical)
 Kate Hudson – actress
 Phil Hughes – baseball player
 Yolanda Hughes-Heying – IFBB professional bodybuilder
 Barry Hunau – illustrator
 William Hung – American Idol contestant
 Helen Hunt – actress
 Terry Huntingdon – Miss USA 1959
 Nipsey Hussle – rapper
 Anjelica Huston – actress
 Nyjah Huston – professional skateboarder
 Timothy Hutton – actor
 Tiffany Hwang – singer (Girls' Generation)

I 

 Ruby Ibarra – Filipino-born rapper
 Ice Cube – musician and actor
 Ice-T – rapper, songwriter, actor, and producer
 Gabriel Iglesias – comedian
 iLoveMakonnen – rapper, singer, and record producer 
 Danny Im – member of Korean music group 1TYM
 Grant Imahara – electronics and radio control expert (MythBusters)
 Don Imus – radio personality
 Allison Iraheta – singer (American Idol)
 Kathy Ireland – model
 Bill Irwin – actor and clown
 Chris Isaak – musician and actor
 Yasuhiro Ishimoto – photographer
Nick Itkin (born 1999) - Olympic fencer, junior world champion
 Phil Ivey – professional poker player

J 

 Jazzmun – actress
 Marielle Jaffe – actress
 Skai Jackson – actress
 Shirley Jackson (1916–1965) – author
 Helen Jacobs (1908–1997) – tennis player ranked world #1
 Etta James – singer
 Jesse James – actor, welder, and chief executive officer of West Coast Choppers
 Tom Jancar – contemporary art dealer (Jancar Kuhlenschmidt Gallery)
 Dinah Jane – singer (Fifth Harmony)
 Gregg Jarrett – lawyer and journalist
 BC Jean – singer
Davon Jefferson (born 1986) – basketball player in the Israeli Basketball Premier League
 Richard Jefferson – professional basketball player
Chantel Jeffries – model
 Fran Jeffries – actress (The Pink Panther)
 Kris Jenner – reality star
 Kendall Jenner – reality star, model, and TV personality
 Kylie Jenner – reality star, model, TV, and social media personality
 Steve Jobs – computer pioneer and co-founder of Apple Computer
 Anjelah Johnson – actress and comedian
 Ashley Johnson – actress
 Dwayne Johnson – professional wrestler best known as "The Rock"; actor (The Fast and the Furious)
 Jimmie Johnson – NASCAR driver and champion
 Kevin Johnson – basketball player and politician
 Keyshawn Johnson – football player
 Randy Johnson – baseball player
 Haley Jones – basketball player
 Angelina Jolie – actress
 Jerry Jones – owner of the Dallas Cowboys
 Marion Jones – track athlete
 Matt Jones – actor (Breaking Bad) and comedian
 Rashida Jones – actress
 Tamala Jones – actress
 Sharon Jordan – actress (The Suite Life of Zack & Cody)
 Ashley Judd – actress
 Aaron Judge – baseball player
 Krystal Jung – cousin of Juliette Rodriguez Singer (f(x))

K 

 Pauline Kael – film critic
 Colin Kaepernick – National Football League quarterback
 Ryan Kalish – Major League Baseball outfielder
 Tony Kanal – bassist with No Doubt
 Anita Kanter – tennis player ranked in world top 10
 Avi Kaplan – singer-songwriter 
 Gabe Kapler – Major League Baseball outfielder, and manager of the San Francisco Giants
 Jason Kapono – former professional basketball player
 Carl Karcher – founder of Carl's Jr.
 Khloé Kardashian – socialite and reality TV personality
 Kim Kardashian – socialite and reality TV personality
 Kourtney Kardashian – socialite and reality TV personality
 Rob Kardashian – socialite and reality TV personality
 Robert Kardashian – American attorney and businessman
 Terry Karl – professor of Latin American Studies at Stanford University
 Deena Kastor – Olympic runner
 Chris Kattan – actor and comedian
 Julie Kavner – actress
 Diane Keaton – actress, director, and producer
 Keb' Mo' – blues singer-songwriter and guitarist
 Kehlani – singer
 Eliza D. Keith – educator, suffragist, and journalist
 Sally Kellerman – actress
 Jamill Kelly – Olympic freestyle wrestler
 Minka Kelly – actress
 Andrew Keegan – actor (10 Things I Hate About You)
 Edmund Kemper – serial killer
 Anthony Kennedy – Supreme Court justice
 Kirk Kerkorian – investor and philanthropist
 Baby Keem – rapper
 Riley Keough – actress
 Kesha – singer 
 Jason Kidd – NBA player and coach
 Val Kilmer – actor
 Down AKA Kilo – rapper
 Billie Jean King – tennis player
 Elle King
 Joey King – actress
 Kerry King – guitarist (Slayer)
 Regina King – actress
 Rodney King – police brutality victim
 Maxine Hong Kingston – author
 Thomas Kinkade – artist
 Hayley Kiyoko – singer-songwriter, dancer and actress
 Erwin Klein (died 1992) – table tennis player
 Perry Klein (born 1971) – NFL quarterback
 Alix Klineman (born 1989) – volleyball player
 Matthew Knight – actor
 Suge Knight – record producer and music executive (Death Row Records)
 Kyle Korver – basketball player
 Kira Kosarin – singer and actress
 Joel Kramer – basketball player
 Kreayshawn – rapper, singer and music video director 
 Dean Kremer (born 1996) – Israeli-American Major League Baseball pitcher
 Nathan Kress – actor (iCarly)
 Kayden Kross – pornographic actress
 Alex Kurtzman – filmmaker (Transformers)
Leo Krupnik (born 1979) - Ukrainian-born American-Israeli former soccer player and current soccer coach
 Mike Krukow – baseball pitcher and announcer (San Francisco Giants)
 Lisa Kudrow – actress (Friends)
 Raja Kumari – Indian-American rapper, songwriter, and singer 
 Greg Kurstin – musician and producer (The Bird and the Bee)
 Michelle Kwan – figure skater
 Iris Kyle – 10-time overall Ms. Olympia professional bodybuilder
 Zoe Kazan – actress
 Kevin Kiner – film and television composer

L 

 Shia LaBeouf – actor
 Remy LaCroix – pornographic actress
 Kendrick Lamar – rapper, songwriter, and record producer
 Phil LaMarr – voice artist
 Adam Lambert – singer (American Idol)
 Michelle Lambert – singer
 Matthew Lane – professional golfer
 Brie Larson – actress 
 Bianca Lawson – actress
 Kyle Larson – racing driver
 Greg Laswell – singer and musician
 Ryan Lavarnway – Israeli-American major-league baseball catcher (Los Angeles Dodgers)
 Lauv – singer-songwriter 
 Rick Law – illustrator and producer
 Tony Lazzeri – baseball player
Brad Leaf – Israeli-American basketball player for Hapoel Galil Elyon and Maccabi Tel Aviv of the Israel Premier League 
 T. J. Leaf – Israeli-American NBA basketball player
 Amy Lee – musician (lead singer of Evanescence)
 Bruce Lee – martial artist
 Jason Lee – actor (My Name Is Earl)
 Tommy Lee – Greek-American musician 
 Catherine LeFrançois – IFBB professional bodybuilder
 Janet Leigh – actress
 Jennifer Jason Leigh – actress (Fast Times at Ridgemont High)
 Thomas W. Lentz – art historian
 Kawhi Leonard – basketball player
 Logan Lerman – actor 
 Brad Lesley – baseball player and cast member on Takeshi's Castle
 Adam Levine – musician (lead singer of pop/rock group Maroon 5)
 Camille Levin – soccer player
 Savannah Levin – soccer player 
 Alexander Lévy – professional golfer
 Monica Lewinsky – White House intern
 Huey Lewis – musician (Huey Lewis and the News)
 Juliette Lewis – actress
 Louise Lieberman (born 1977) – soccer coach and former player
 Rob Liefeld – comic book writer
 Xian Lim – Filipino actor, model, singer, host, blogger, filmmaker and professional basketball player
 Jeremy Lin – basketball player
 Seven Lions – musician
 Jonathan Lipnicki – actor (Stuart Little)
 David Lipsky – golfer
 Scott Lipsky – tennis player
 Peyton List – actress (Bunk'd)
 Blake Lively – actress (Gossip Girl)
 Heather Locklear – actress
 Alison Lohman – actress
 Jack London – author (The Call of the Wild)
 Lauren London – TV personality, actress, and model
 Evan Longoria – baseball player
 George Lopez – actor and comedian (George Lopez)
 Mario Lopez – actor (Saved by the Bell)
 Nancy Lopez – golfer
 Erik Lorig – football player (New Orleans Saints)
 John Logan – film screenwriter
 Caity Lotz – actress, dancer, and singer
 Greg Louganis – Olympic diver
 Billie Lourd – actress
 Demi Lovato – actress and singer
 Darlene Love – singer and actress
 Courtney Love – musician
 Kevin Love – basketball player
 Mike Love – singer and songwriter
 Jon Lovitz – actor
 George Lucas – filmmaker (Star Wars)
 Lorna Luft – singer and actress
 Athena Lundberg – Playboy Playmate of the Month (January 2006)
 Ray Lynch – actor
 Ross Lynch – singer (R5) and actor (Austin & Ally)
 Cheryl Lynn – singer
 Swae Lee – rapper
 Jane Levy – actress

M 

 Alex Mack – NFL center
 Judah Leon Magnes – rabbi, first President of the Hebrew University of Jerusalem
 Tobey Maguire – actor and producer
 Theodore Maiman – inventor of Ruby Laser Systems Laser
 Daron Malakian – musician, singer-songwriter, and guitarist (System of a Down)
 Rami Malek – actor
 Mia Malkova – pornographic actress
 Nazanin Mandi – actress, model, and singer
 Ricky Manning – football player
 Bruce Manson (born 1956) – tennis player
 Josie Maran – actress and model
 Laura Marano – actress (Austin & Ally)
 Vanessa Marano – actress (Switched at Birth)
 Stacy Margolin (born 1959) – tennis player
 Constance Marie – actress
 Teena Marie – singer
 Cheech Marin – actor
 Shannon Marketic – Miss USA 1992
 Meghan Markle – actress and member of the British royal family
 McKayla Maroney – 2012 Olympic gold and silver medalist (artistic gymnastics)
 Dean Paul Martin – actor and musician
 Steve Martin – actor
 Bobby Martinez – professional surfer
 Chris Masters – professional wrestler
 Sam Match (1923–2010) – tennis player
 Tim Matheson – actor
 Bob Mathias – decathlete
 Rachel Matthews – actress
 Casey Matthews – football linebacker
 Clay Matthews Jr. – football linebacker
 Clay Matthews III – football linebacker
 Margie Marvelous – professional bodybuilder
 Kathy May – tennis player
 Misty May-Treanor – volleyball player
 MC Hammer – musician
 Leigh McCloskey – actor and artist (Dallas)
 Pete McCloskey – politician
 Willie McCool – astronaut; killed in Space Shuttle Columbia disaster
 Maureen McCormick – actress
 Jennette McCurdy – actress and singer
 Audra McDonald – actress and singer
 Willie McGee – baseball player
 Ted McGinley – actor
 Jeremy McGrath – supercross racer
 Sean McNamara – filmmaker
 Mark McGwire – baseball player
 Robert McNamara – former United States Secretary of Defense
 Katharine McPhee – singer and actress
 Casey Mears – NASCAR driver
 Edwin Meese – United States Attorney General (1985–88)
 Meghan, Duchess of Sussex – actress and British royal
 Rodney Melville – judge
 Bob Melvin – Major League Baseball player and manager
 Bridgit Mendler – actress and singer
 Mike Mentzer – professional bodybuilder and 1979 Mr. Olympia heavyweight champion
 Lee Meriwether – actress and Miss America
 Casey Merrill – NFL running back
 Derek Mears – actor and stuntman
 AJ Michalka – actress and musician
 Aly Michalka – actress and singer
 Phil Mickelson – golfer
 Miguel – singer and producer
 Johnny Miller – golfer and TV commentator
 Jon Miller – sportscaster
 Marisa Miller – supermodel
 Penelope Ann Miller – actress
 Reggie Miller – basketball player (Indiana Pacers)
 Stanley Miller – chemist
 Norm Mineta – U.S. Secretary of Commerce and Transportation
 Hasan Minhaj – comedian
 Liza Minnelli – singer and actress (Cabaret)
 Patricia Miranda – Olympic women's freestyle wrestler
 Elizabeth Mitchell – actress
 Shay Mitchell – actress (Pretty Little Liars)
 Ron Mix – Hall of Fame football player
 Joe Mixon – NFL running back
 Marilyn Monroe – sex symbol and actress (Some Like It Hot)
 Matthew Modine – actor (Full Metal Jacket)
 Cameron Monaghan – actor and model
 Elizabeth Montgomery – actress (Bewitched)
 Shemar Moore – actor
 Terry Moore – actress (Mighty Joe Young)
 Alex Morgan – United States women's national soccer team striker
 Pat Morita  – Japanese-American actor and comedian
 John Morrison – professional wrestler
 George Moscone – Mayor of San Francisco
 Jon Moscot – American-Israeli Major League Baseball player for the Cincinnati Reds
 Merrill Moses – Olympic medalist water polo player
 Shane Mosley – boxer
 Warren Moon – football player
 Kyle Mooney – actor and comedian (Saturday Night Live)
 Elisabeth Moss – actress
 Bethany Mota – YouTuber
 Jason Mraz – singer and musician
 Manny MUA – makeup artist
 Megan Mullally – actress
 Marcus Mumford – singer and musician (Mumford & Sons)
 Bill Mumy – child actor (Lost in Space)
 Noah Munck – actor (iCarly)
 Eddie Murray – baseball player (Baltimore Orioles)
 Lenda Murray – IFBB professional bodybuilder
 Dave Mustaine – musician (Megadeth)
 Dave McCary – comedian and director
 Mozhan Marnò – television actress

N 

 Niecy Nash – actress
 Kent Nagano  – conductor 
 Mirai Nagasu – figure skater
 Sam Nahem (1915–2004) – Major League Baseball pitcher
 Kathy Najimy – actress (King of the Hill)
 Corey Nakatani  – horse racing jockey
 Anna Nalick – singer-songwriter
 Hani Naser (1950–2020) - Jordanian-American musician
 Dave Navarro – guitarist (Jane’s Addiction)
 Lorenzo Neal – Pro Bowl football player
 Jeff Newman – Major League Baseball All-Star baseball player and manager
 Laraine Newman – comedian, actress, and voice artist
 Randy Newman – composer and musician
 Gavin Newsom – Governor of California; former Mayor of San Francisco (2004–2011)
 Joanna Newsom – singer and harpist
 Leyna Nguyen – Vietnamese born television anchor
 Nichkhun – Thai-American singer and rapper of 2PM
 Christina Nigra – actress
 Richard Nixon – 37th President of the United States
 Lyn Nofziger – author, journalist, and White House Press Secretary (under Ronald Reagan)
 Isamu Noguchi – artist
 Bradley Nowell – singer and musician (Sublime)
 James Nunnally (born 1990) – basketball for Maccabi Tel Aviv of the Israeli Basketball Premier League and the Euroleague, formerly in the NBA
 Emilio Nava – tennis player

O 

 Dagmar Oakland – stage and screen actress
 Willis O'Brien – film special-effects artist
 Frank Ocean – singer (Odd Future)
 Aubrey O'Day – singer (Danity Kane)
 Lefty O'Doul – baseball player
 Larisa Oleynik – actress
 Edward James Olmos – actor
 Elizabeth Olsen – actress
 Mary-Kate and Ashley Olsen – actresses and entrepreneurs
 Susan Olsen – actress
 Igor Olshansky – National Football League defensive end
 Omarion – musician and singer
 Ryan O'Neal – actor
 Tatum O'Neal – actress
 Heather O'Rourke – actress
 Jenna Ortega – actress 
 Emily Osment – actress and singer
 Haley Joel Osment – actor
 Jimmy Osmond − singer
 Ryann O'Toole – professional golfer

P 

 Christopher Mintz-Plasse – actor (McLovin) in (Superbad)
 Carson Palmer – football quarterback
 Gwyneth Paltrow – actress
 Cathey Palyo – IFBB professional bodybuilder
 Leon Panetta – White House Chief of Staff and Secretary of Defense
 Jon Pardi – singer and musician
 Jerry Paris – director and actor (The Dick Van Dyke Show)
 Grace Park – actress (Battlestar Galactica, Hawaii Five-0)
 Jae Park – Argentine born K-pop singer
 Richard Park – ice hockey forward for the New York Islanders
 Harry Partch – composer
 Audrina Patridge – TV personality, television presenter, actress, and model
 Dylan Patton – actor
 George S. Patton – military commander
 Paula Patton – actress
 Jake Paul – YouTuber
 Logan Paul – YouTuber
 Corey Pavin – golfer
 Sara Paxton – actress and singer
 Gary Payton – professional basketball player
 Gregory Peck – actor
 Sam Peckinpah – film director
 Joc Pederson – baseball player for the San Francisco Giants
 Dustin Pedroia – baseball player
 Lisa Pelikan – actress
 Nancy Pelosi – California Congresswoman and first Californian and first woman Speaker of the United States House of Representatives serving from 2007 to 2011 and again from 2019 to 2023
 Nia Peeples – singer and actress
 Chris Penn – actor
 Sean Penn – actor
 Stacy Peralta – skateboarder, surfer, and movie director
 Melina Perez – professional wrestler
 Bradley Steven Perry – actor
 Katy Perry – singer
 Bryan Petersen – baseball player
 Lakey Peterson – professional surfer
 Michelle Pfeiffer – actress
 Paul Pierce – professional basketball player
 Kevin Pillar – baseball player
 Chris Pine – actor
 Eric Pierpoint – actor
 Drew Pinsky – radio and TV personality, physician, and addiction medicine specialist
 Kelsey Plum – basketball player
 Eve Plumb – actress
 Jim Plunkett – football quarterback (Oakland Raiders)
 Brennan Poole – NASCAR driver
 Whitney Port – TV personality, fashion designer, and author
 Tyler Posey – actor
 Stefanie Powers – actress
 Tristan Prettyman – singer and musician
 Tayshaun Prince – professional basketball player (Detroit Pistons)
 Freddie Prinze Jr. – actor
 Snow Tha Product – rapper
 Kelly Pryce – stand-up comedian
 Jade Puget – musician (AFI)
 Jade Pettyjohn – actress

Q 
 Jack Quaid – actor
 Kathleen Quinlan – actress
 J. G. Quintel – animator and voice actor (Regular Show)

R 

 Scott Radinsky – Major League Baseball player and coach
 Shelby Rabara – actress
 Frances Rafferty – actress
 Max Rafferty – former California State Superintendent of Public Instruction, author, and columnist
 Francia Raisa – actress
 Bonnie Raitt – singer
 Ben Rattray – founder and CEO of Change.org
 Ronald Reagan – Governor of California (1967–1975), former actor, and 40th President of the United States
 Tyler Reddick – NASCAR driver 
 Robert Redford – actor and director
 Nikki Reed – actress
 Mason Reese – child actor
 Autumn Reeser – actress (The O.C.)
 Andy Reid – football coach
 Tasha Reign – pornographic actress, nude model, producer, and sex columnist
 Maria Remenyi – Miss USA 1966
 Jeremy Renner – actor
 Dane Reynolds – professional surfer (Quiksilver)
 Ryan Reynolds – award winning actor born in Canada lives in California
 Roddy Ricch – rapper
 Christina Ricci – actress (The Addams Family)
 Robert Ri'chard – actor
 Ariana Richards – actress
 Kyle Richards – actress and television personality
 Michael Richards – actor (Seinfeld)
 Nicole Richie – actress
 Sofia Richie – model
 Sally Ride – astronaut (STS-7 and STS-41-G)
 Isiah Rider – basketball player
 Cathy Rigby – gymnast and actress (Peter Pan)
 Rihanna – Barbadian singer
 Molly Ringwald – actress
 Jason Ritter – actor (son of John Ritter; grandson of Tex Ritter)
 Jenni Rivera – singer
 Naya Rivera – actress and singer
 Ron Rivera – American football player and coach
 Lil Rob – Chicano rapper
 Tim Robbins – actor
 Tony Robbins – life coach
 Jackie Robinson – Baseball Hall of Famer who broke Major League Baseball's 20th-century color line
 Julia Robinson – mathematician
 Lela Rochon – actress
 Sam Rockwell – actor
 Aaron Rodgers – National Football League quarterback
 Destiny Rogers – singer
 Olivia Rodrigo – singer and actress
 Paul Rodriguez – Mexican-born comedian, actor, singer and rapper
 Dana Rohrabacher – member of the United States House of Representatives
 Jimmy Rollins – baseball player
 Jim Rome – sports radio host
 Rebecca Romijn – model and actress
 Tony Romo – football quarterback
 Al Rosen – Major League Baseball MVP; four-time All-Star
Daniel Rosenbaum (born 1997) – American-Israeli basketball player in the Israel Basketball Premier League
 Kyla Ross – 2012 Olympic gold medalist (artistic gymnastics)
 Alexander Rossi – racing driver
 Josiah Royce – philosopher
 Pete Rozelle – National Football League commissioner
 FaZe Rug – YouTuber 
 RuPaul – drag queen
 Bill Russell – basketball player
 Keri Russell – actress
 Rene Russo – actress
 Jesse Rutherford – musician
 Marla Ruzicka – activist (Green Party)
 Ronda Rousey – professional wrestler, former mixed martial artist, former UFC bantamweight champion
 Megan Rapinoe – professional soccer player, Olympic gold medalist

S 

 Sonny Sandoval – musician
 Katey Sagal – actress (Futurama)
 Halston Sage –  actress
 Andy Samberg – actor and comedian 
 Daniel Samohin – Israeli Olympic figure skater
 Josh Samuels (born 1991) – Olympic water polo player 
 Jessica Sanchez – singer-songwriter 
 Saweetie – rapper, singer-songwriter
 Samia – musician
 Monte Scheinblum – 1992 U.S. and world long-driving golf champion
 Eli Schenkel (born 1992) -  Canadian Olympic fencer
 Schoolboy Q – rapper
 Rob Schneider – actor 
 Dave Schultz – Olympic gold medalist in freestyle wrestling
 Mark Schultz – Olympic gold medalist in freestyle wrestling
 Arnold Schwarzenegger – Austrian-American actor, former bodybuilder, businessman, and former Governor of California (2003–2011)
 Patrick Schwarzenegger – actor, model, and son of Maria Shriver and Arnold Schwarzenegger
 Jason Schwartzman – actor
 Tom Seaver – baseball player
 Jason Sehorn – NFL cornerback
 Christian Serratos – actress (The Walking Dead)
 Mike Seidman (born 1981) – NFL tight end
 Logan Seavey – racing driver
 Jason Segel – actor, comedian, screenwriter, and author
 Vic Seixas – Hall of Fame former top-10 tennis player
 Edgar Seligman (1867–1958) – San Francisco-born British six-time fencing champion and two-time Olympic fencing medalist
 Tupac Shakur – actor/rapper
 Samantha Shapiro (born 1993) – gymnast
 Sharon Shapiro – gymnast
 Judy Shapiro-Ikenberry (born 1942) – long-distance runner
 Charlie Sheen – actor
 Art Sherman (born 1937) – horse trainer and jockey
 Richard Sherman – NFL cornerback
 Marley Shelton – actress
 Ryan Sherriff (born 1990) – Major League Baseball pitcher
 Larry Sherry (1935–2006) – baseball pitcher
 Norm Sherry (1931–2021) – catcher, manager, and coach in Major League Baseball
 Mike Shinoda – musician (Linkin Park)
 Too Short – rapper
 Alicia Silverstone – actress (Clueless)
 Jerry Simon (born 1968) – American-Israeli basketball player
 Diamon Simpson (born 1987) – basketball player in the Israel Basketball Premier League
 O. J. Simpson – retired football player (Buffalo Bills), actor, and convicted felon
 Simon Singer (born 1941) – world champion American handball player, and radio and television actor
 Nikki Sixx – musician (Mötley Crüe)
 Skrillex – DJ and musician
 Matthew Slater – NFL wide receiver and special teams gunner
 Cameron Smith – college football player USC Trojans
 Jaden Smith – actor, rapper, singer-songwriter
 Regan Smith (born 2002) – Olympic swimmer, broke multiple world records in swimming
 Steve Smith Sr. – NFL wide receiver
 JuJu Smith-Schuster – NFL wide receiver
 Duke Snider – baseball player
 Snow Tha Product – rapper
 Liza Soberano – Filipino-American actress, model, and singer
 Brenda Song – actress
 Song Oh-kyun – activist
 Frank Spellman (1922–2017) – Olympic champion weightlifter
 Mark Spitz – nine-time Olympic gold medalist swimmer
 John Stamos – actor
 Leland Stanford – railroad tycoon
 Jeffree Star – makeup artist
 Martin Starr – actor
 Michael Stuhlbarg – actor
 Gwen Stefani – singer-songwriter, and fashion designer
 Maggie Steffens (born 1993) – professional water polo player, two-time Olympic gold medalist
 John Steinbeck – author (East of Eden, Of Mice and Men)
 Hailee Steinfeld – actress, singer-songwriter
 Amandla Stenberg – actress
 Rosie Stephenson-Goodknight - Wikipedian
 Daniel Steres – professional soccer player with the LA Galaxy
 Brett Sterling – ice hockey player
 Todd Steussie – football player
 Ted Stevens (1923-2010) - U.S. Senator from Alaska (1968-2009) and Solicitor of the Department of Interior (1960-1961)
 Booboo Stewart – actor
 Fivel Stewart – actress
 Kristen Stewart – actress
 Lindsey Stirling – violinist
 Robert Stock – Major League Baseball baseball pitcher
 Spencer Stone – United States Air Force Staff Sergeant known for stopping a gunman in a Paris-bound train from Amsterdam via Brussels and author of The 15:17 to Paris: The True Story of a Terrorist, a Train, and Three American Heroes
 Darryl Strawberry – baseball player
 Stephen Swartz – singer and musician
 Jodie Sweetin – actress
 Alison Sweeney – actress
 Emelie Tracy Y. Swett – poet, author, educator
 Adam G. Sevani – actor and dancer
 Atticus Shaffer – actor
 Jeremy Sumpter – actor

T 

 Amber Tamblyn – actress (Joan of Arcadia)
 Russ Tamblyn – actor (West Side Story)
 Amy Tan – writer (The Joy Luck Club)
Isaiah Taylor (born 1994) – basketball player in the Israeli Basketball Premier League
 Scout Taylor-Compton – actress (Halloween)
 Technoblade – youtuber (1999–2022)
 Brian Teacher – tennis player (ranked as high as # 7), Australian Open champion, and coach
 TeeFlii – rapper and producer
 Aimee Teegarden – actress and model
 Rowdy Tellez – baseball player
 Eliot Teltscher – tennis player
 Shirley Temple – child film star, former U.S. Ambassador to Ghana, and Czechoslovakia
 Zack Test – rugby union player
 Reggie Theus – basketball player and coach
 Robin Thicke – singer
 Nosaj Thing – producer
 Klay Thompson – basketball player
 Stephen Thompson Jr. (born 1997) - basketball player in the Israeli Basketball Premier League
 Tessa Thompson – actress 
 Pat Tillman – football player and soldier
 Jennifer Tilly – actress
 Tinashe – singer
 Kenneth Tobey – actor
 Mark Tollefsen (born 1992) – basketball player, 2018-19 top scorer in the Israel Basketball Premier League
 Shaun Tomson (born 1955) – South African world champion surfer
 Dara Torres (born 1967) – competitive swimmer, first American swimmer to become a five-time Olympian
 Alessandra Torresani – actress
 Josie Totah – actress
 Pat Toomay – former football player
 Alan Trammell – baseball player
 Karrueche Tran – actress and model 
 Danny Trejo – actor
 Michael Trevino – actor
 Michael Trucco – actor (Battlestar Galactica)
 Robert Trujillo – bassist (Metallica)
 Mark Tuan – rapper
 Lisa Tucker – singer
 Mark Turenshine (1944–2016) – American-Israeli basketball player
 Christy Turlington – model
 Bree Turner – actress (Grimm)
 Justin Turner – baseball player
 Ryan Turell (born 1999) - basketball player for the G-League Motor City Cruise, Yeshiva University.
 Tyga – rapper, singer-songwriter, and actor
 Aisha Tyler – actress
 Ty Dolla Sign – rapper
 Tyler, the Creator – rapper and record producer (Odd Future)
 Luca de la Torre – soccer player

U 
 Ben Underwood – blind teen best known as one of the world's most proficient echolocators
 Chase Utley – baseball player

V 

 Jasmine V – singer
Aaron Valdes (born 1993) – basketball player in the Israeli Basketball Premier League
 Ritchie Valens – singer
 Karen Valentine – actress
 Mariano Guadalupe Vallejo – Mexican general and American politician
 Jason Vargas – baseball pitcher for the Philadelphia Phillies
 Elle Varner – singer
 Jake Varner – Olympic freestyle wrestler, gold medalist at 2012 Summer Olympics
 Andrew Vasquez – Native American flute player
 Jhonen Vasquez – comic-book writer and artist
 Jovan Vavic – USC water polo coach
 Cain Velasquez – professional wrestler
 Stephen Venard – lawman
 Julieta Venegas – singer and musician
 Milo Ventimiglia – actor
 Ken Venturi – golfer
 Gwen Verdon – actress
 Victoria Vetri – model and actress
 Robert M. Viale – U.S. Medal of Honor recipient
 Antonio Villaraigosa – 51st Mayor of Los Angeles
 Roy Marlin Voris – World War II flying ace and founder of the United States Navy Blue Angels

W 

 Aly Wagner – retired soccer player
 Rachel Wacholder (born 1975) – professional beach volleyball player and model
 Bobby Wagner – NFL linebacker
 Lindsay Wagner – actress
 Paul Walker – actor (The Fast and the Furious)
 Bill Walsh – football coach
 Laurie Walters – actress (Eight Is Enough)
 Bill Walton – Hall of Fame basketball player
 Luke Walton – basketball player
 Andre Ward – 2004 Summer Olympics gold medal-winning boxer
 Zhavia Ward –  singer
 Earl Warren – 30th Governor of California and 14th Chief Justice of the United States (1953–1969)
 Rick Warren – pastor and author
 Ryn Weaver – singer
 Caspar Weinberger – United States Secretary of Defense
 Phil Weintraub (1907–1987) – Major League Baseball first baseman and outfielder
 Bob Weir – musician (Grateful Dead)
 Zack Weiss – American-Israeli Major League Baseball player
 Abbey Weitzeil – Olympic swimmer
 Brian Welch – musician and guitarist (Korn)
 Russell Westbrook – basketball player
 Chanel West Coast – television personality, rapper, and singer
 Jill Whelan – actress (Airplane!)
 Adam Wheeler – Olympic Greco-Roman wrestler
 Stephen Girard Whipple – 49er, newspaper editor, Union Army officer, and politician
 Shaun White – snowboarder
 Mae Whitman – actress and singer 
 Brandon Whitt – NASCAR driver
 Sidney Wicks – basketball player
 Jordan Wilimovsky (born 1994) – Olympic pool swimmer and open water swimmer
 will.i.am – rapper, singer-songwriter, record producer, entrepreneur, actor, and member of The Black Eyed Peas
 Barry Williams – actor
 Derrick Williams – basketball player with Maccabi Tel Aviv of the Israeli Basketball Premier League and the EuroLeague; formerly with five NBA teams
 Jamaal Williams – football player
 Emily Williams – early 20th-century architect
 Esther Williams – actress
 John Williams – composer
 Paul Williams – architect
 Serena Williams – tennis player
 Ted Williams – Hall of Fame baseball player
 Venus Williams – tennis player
 Dave Williamson – stand-up comedian
 Dontrelle Willis – baseball player (Miami Marlins)
 Helen Wills – tennis player
 Brian Wilson – musician (The Beach Boys)
 Carl Wilson – musician (The Beach Boys)
 Rita Wilson – actress
 Ariel Winter – actress (Modern Family)
 Josh Wise – NASCAR driver
 Tamara Witmer – model
 Zachary Wohlman – boxer
 Wally Wolf (1930–1997) – swimmer, water polo player, and Olympic champion
 Matthew Wolff – professional golfer
 Nat Wolff – actor and musician
 Chris Wondolowski – professional soccer player
 Linda Wong – pornographic actress
 Victor Wong (1906–1972) – actor (King Kong)
 Victor Wong (1927–2001) – actor (Big Trouble in Little China)
 Kevin Woo – singer and TV personality (U-KISS)
 Beatrice Wood – artist
 Natalie Wood – actress (This Property Is Condemned)
 David Woodard – conductor and writer
 John Wooden – college basketball coach
 Cynthia Woodhead – swimmer
 Shailene Woodley – actress
 Tiger Woods – golfer
 Steve Wozniak – inventor of the Apple Computer
 Jason Wright – American football player and executive
 Noah Wyle – actor
 Ali Wong – stand-up comedian and actress

X 
 Lil Xan – rapper

Y 

 Kristi Yamaguchi – professional figure skater
 Elliott Yamin – singer
 Jenny Y Yang – chemist
 "Weird Al" Yankovic – parodist and musician
 Steve Yeager – Major League Baseball catcher
 Yeat – rapper
 Anton Yelchin – actor
 YG – rapper and actor
 Charlyne Yi – actress and comedian
 Tina Yothers – actress (Family Ties)
 Kevin Youkilis – All-Star Major League Baseball player
 Adrian Young – No Doubt's drummer
 Emily Mae Young – actress
 Nick Young – professional basketball player
 Joon Yun – radiologist

Z 

 Frank Zamboni – inventor
 Joanna Zeiger – Olympic and world champion triathlete, and author
 Zendaya – actress and singer
 Anthony Zerbe – actor
 Zoya – folk singer
 Elmo Zumwalt – Chief of Naval Operations
 Daphne Zuniga – actress
 Danielle von Zerneck – actress

Musical groups 

 Adema – nu metal band
 AFI – rock band
 Alien Ant Farm – rock band
 As I Lay Dying – metal band
 Atreyu – metalcore band
 Audioslave – rock band
 Avenged Sevenfold – metal band
 Bad Religion – punk band
 The Bangles – pop band
 The Beach Boys – pop band
 Bikini Girls – pop band
 The Bird and the Bee – indie duo
 Black Eyed Peas – pop/rap group
 Black Flag – hardcore band
 Blind Melon – psychedelic rock band
 Blink-182 – pop/punk band
 Body Count – rap/metal band
 The Byrds – folk rock band
 Circle Jerks – punk band
 Coal Chamber – nu metal band
 Concrete Blonde – alternative band
 Counting Crows – rock band
 Crazy Town – rap/rock band
 Creedence Clearwater Revival – rock band
 Cypress Hill – hip hop band
 Dead Kennedys – rock band
 Deftones – progressive metal band
 The Donnas – rock band
 The Doors – rock band
 The Eagles – rock band
 Eels – alternative band
 Faith No More – alternative band
 Far East Movement – hip hop band
 Fear Factory – metal band
 Fishbone – alternative band
 Flogging Molly – Celtic punk band
 Geraldine Fibbers – alternative band
 Germs – punk band
 The Go-Go's – pop band
 Grateful Dead – folk rock band
 Green Day – rock band
 Guns N' Roses – hard rock band
 Hed PE – rap/rock band
 Hollywood Undead – rap/metal band
 Hoobastank – rock band
 In Fear And Faith – metal band
 Incubus – rock band
 Jane's Addiction – alternative band
 Jefferson Airplane – rock band
 Journey – rock band
 Julien-K – synth band
 Korn – nu metal band
 Lifehouse – pop rock band
 Linkin Park – alternative rock band
 Machine Head – heavy metal band
 Mad at the World – Christian rock band
 Maroon 5 – rock band
 Megadeth – metal band
 Metallica – metal band
 Minutemen – punk band
 The Monkees – pop band
 Mötley Crüe – hard rock band
 Mr. Bungle – experimental rock band
 N.W.A – hip hop group
 No Doubt – ska-punk band
 The O.C. Supertones – ska band
 Of Mice & Men – metalcore band
 The Offspring – rock band
 Oingo Boingo – new wave band
 Orgy – synth
 Otep – heavy metal band
 P.O.D. – rock band
 Papa Roach – rap/metal band
 Prophets of Rage – rap/metal band
 Queens of the Stone Age – rock band
 Rage Against the Machine – rap/metal band
 Ratt – hard rock band
 Red Hot Chili Peppers – rock band
 Sixx:A.M. – rock band
 Slayer – metal band
 Smile Empty Soul – post-grunge band
 Snot – rock band
 Social Distortion – punk band
 Spineshank – metal band
 Static-X – industrial metal band
 Stone Temple Pilots – hard rock band
 Sublime – ska-punk and dub band
 Suicidal Tendencies – punk/metal band
 Suicide Silence – metal band
 Switchfoot – rock band
 System of a Down – metal band
 Tesla – hard rock band
 Third Eye Blind – rock band
 Thrice – rock band
 Tool – progressive metal band
 Trapt – rock band
 Van Halen – hard rock band
 Velvet Revolver – hard rock band
 The Wallflowers – rock band
 Weezer – alternative rock band
 X – alternative/punk band

California transplants 

 Samuel Brannan – newspaper publisher
 Juan Rodríguez Cabrillo – Spanish explorer
 César Chávez – labor leader
 Juan Bautista de Anza – Spanish explorer
 Gaspar de Portolà – Spanish explorer
 Larry Ellison – co-founder of Oracle Corporation
 John C. Frémont – explorer, military officer, U.S. senator from California
 Domingo Ghirardelli – chocolatier (Ghirardelli Chocolate Company)
 Chick Hearn – National Basketball Association announcer for the Los Angeles Lakers
 William Redington Hewlett – co-founder of Hewlett-Packard
 Bob Hope – actor, singer, and comedian
 Steve Jurvetson – venture capitalist (a managing director of Draper Fisher Jurvetson)
 James Lick – real estate baron
 Steve Martin – actor, author, comedian, and director
 Johnny Mathis – singer ("Chances Are")
 Fritz Maytag – former owner of Anchor Brewing Company in San Francisco; Chairman of the Board of the Maytag Dairy Farms
 Thomas Mesereau – criminal defense lawyer
 Joe Montana – National Football League quarterback
 Joe Morgan – baseball player
 John Muir – naturalist
 Joshua A. Norton – British self-proclaimed "Emperor of the United States and Protector of Mexico"
 Buck Owens – country music performer
 Ronald Reagan – actor and 40th President of the United States
 Carlos Santana – Mexican musician
 Michael Savage – author, political commentator, radio host
 Charles M. Schulz – cartoonist
 Arnold Schwarzenegger – Governor of California, actor, and bodybuilder
 Vin Scully – announcer for Major League Baseball's Los Angeles Dodgers
 Glenn T. Seaborg – chemist
 Junipero Serra – Spanish missionary
 Steven Spielberg – director
 Leland Stanford – railroad baron, Governor of California, and founder of Stanford University
 Ken Starr – lawyer and university law dean
 Levi Strauss – Bavarian clothing manufacturer
 John Sutter – Swiss real estate baron
 Mark Twain – humorist and author
 Lars Ulrich – musician (Metallica)
 Sarah Winchester – heiress, eccentric and builder of the Winchester Mystery House
 Charles Wood – musical theatre performer (original Hortensio in Cole Porter's 1948 Broadway musical Kiss Me, Kate)
 Chuck Yeager – U.S. Air Force test pilot
 Ace Young – singer
 Steve Young – National Football League quarterback

See also 

 List of people from San Diego
 List of people from Los Angeles
 List of people from San Francisco
 List of people from Chula Vista, California
 List of people from Long Beach, California
 List of people from Orange County, California
List of California suffragists
 List of people from Palm Springs, California
 List of people from Sacramento, California
 List of people from Malibu, California

References